Jim D'Arcy (born 20 July 1954) is an Irish Fine Gael politician and former member of Seanad Éireann.

He was elected to Louth County Council in 1999, and to Dundalk Town Council in 2004, serving on both bodies until 2011. He unsuccessfully contested the Louth constituency at the 2007 general election. In May 2011, he was nominated by the Taoiseach Enda Kenny to the 24th Seanad.

He is a former school principal. He was the Fine Gael Seanad Spokesperson on Education and Skills during his term.

References

1954 births
Living people
Alumni of St Patrick's College, Dublin
Fine Gael senators
Heads of schools in Ireland
Irish schoolteachers
Local councillors in County Louth
Members of the 24th Seanad
Nominated members of Seanad Éireann
Politicians from County Louth